Aquinas Catholic Schools may refer to:

 Aquinas Schools (Iowa)
 Aquinas Catholic Schools (Nebraska)
 St. Thomas Aquinas High School (Florida)
 Aquinas High School (New York)
 St Thomas Aquinas Catholic School, Birmingham

See also
 List of institutions named after Thomas Aquinas
 Aquinas Academy (disambiguation)
 Aquinas College (disambiguation)
 Aquinas High School (disambiguation)
 St. Thomas Aquinas High School (disambiguation)
 St. Thomas Aquinas Secondary School (disambiguation)